Rivière-du-Nord is a federal electoral district in Quebec, Canada, that has been represented in the House of Commons of Canada since 2004.

Geography
The district consists of the La Rivière-du-Nord Regional County Municipality. It includes the communities of Saint-Jérôme, Sainte-Sophie, Prévost, Saint-Hippolyte and Saint-Colomban

The neighbouring ridings are Argenteuil—La Petite-Nation, Laurentides—Labelle, Joliette, Montcalm, Terrebonne and Mirabel.

History
The electoral district was created in 2003: 83.3% of the population of the riding came from Laurentides, 9.3% from Berthier—Montcalm and 7.4% from Argenteuil—Papineau—Mirabel ridings.  In the 2012 electoral redistribution, the riding lost Saint-Colomban to Mirabel.

Member of Parliament

This riding has elected the following Member of Parliament:

Election results

See also
 List of Canadian federal electoral districts
 Past Canadian electoral districts

References

Campaign expense data from Elections Canada
Riding history from the Library of Parliament
2011 Results from Elections Canada

Notes

Quebec federal electoral districts
Saint-Jérôme